This following List of Royal Air Force operations includes both national and multi-national operations as well as joint and air-only operations that the Royal Air Force has participated in.

References

Citations

Bibliography